Mary Theresa Vidal (née Johnson) (23 June 1815 – 19 November 1873) was a British–Australian writer described as Australia's first female novelist.

Life
Mary was born in Devon, England, the daughter of Britton William Johnson and his wife, Mary Theresa, daughter of P. W. Furse. The poet William Johnson, who took the name of Cory in 1872, was a younger brother. In 1840 she married the Rev. Francis Vidal and came with him to Australia. Her husband had an extensive parish to the south-west of Sydney, at Penrith. 

In 1845, Vidal's first book, Tales for the Bush, was published in Sydney, apparently intended as an instructive work for her servants. Soon afterwards she returned with her husband to England. Ten other volumes of tales and novels were published between 1846 and 1866. She sometimes made use of her experiences in Australia, especially in Bengala, or Some Time Ago (1860). Some of these books ran into more than one edition. She died in 1873 and was survived by her husband, six sons (including George William Vidal) and a daughter.

Works
 Tales for the Bush. Sydney: D. L. Welch, 1845
 Winterton: A Tale. London: Rivington, 1846.
 Esther Merle and Other Tales. London: J. Hughes, 1847
 Cabramatta and Woodleigh Farm. London: Rivington, 1850.
 Home Trials. London: Masters, 1858.
 Ellen Raymond. London: Smith, Elder, 1859. Volume I Volume II Volume III
 Bengala, or Some Time Ago. London: Parker, 1860.
 Florence Temple. London: Smith, Elder, 1862.
 Lucy Helmore. London: J. Morgan, 1863.
 Trials of Rachel Charlcote. London: J. Morgan, 1864.
 Deb Clinton, The Smugglers Daughter. London: MacIntosh, 1866.

References

 J.C. Horner 'Mary Theresa Vidal' Australian Dictionary of Biography online
 Susan McKernan 'Introduction' to Mary Theresa Vidal Bengala, or Some Time Ago

External links
 Mary Theresa Vidal Bengala, or Some Time Ago with introduction by Susan McKernan
 Mary Theresa Vidal Tales for the Bush
 Mary Theresa Vidal The Convict Laundress

1815 births
1873 deaths
Australian women novelists
English emigrants to colonial Australia
19th-century Australian women writers
19th-century British women writers
19th-century Australian novelists